Deh Now-e Mirza Zadeh Sejadi (also Romanized as Deh Now-e Mīrzā Zādeh Sejādī; also known as Deh Now, Deh Now-e Mīrzā Zādeh, and Deh Now-ye Mīrzā Nūrollāh) is a village in Borj-e Akram Rural District, in the Central District of Fahraj County, Kerman Province, Iran. At the 2006 census, its population was 173, in 49 families.

References 

Populated places in Fahraj County